The Sudan Girl Guides Association is the national Guiding organization in Sudan. The association serves 35,000 members (as of 2003). Founded in 1928, the girls-only organization became a full member of the World Association of Girl Guides and Girl Scouts in 1957.

South Sudan

South Sudan became an independent country on July 9, 2011, at which time the organizations split.

See also
 Sudan Scouts Association

References

World Association of Girl Guides and Girl Scouts member organizations
Scouting and Guiding in Sudan
Youth organizations established in 1928